The Juliana Theory / Dawson High is a split album by Greensburg, Pennsylvania-based indie-rock bands The Juliana Theory and Dawson High released in 1998 on Arise Records.

Track listing
The Juliana Theory
D.J.
Speechless
Pictures, Stars And Dreams
Infatuation
Week Long Embrace

Dawson High
Just A Fan
I Didn't Mean To Break Your Heart
Port Matilda
Nice Boy
Goodnight Starlight (Demo)

References

The Juliana Theory albums
1998 EPs
Split EPs